G is the seventh letter of the Latin alphabet.

G may also refer to:

Places 
 Gabon, international license plate code G
 Glasgow, UK postal code G
 Eastern Quebec, Canadian postal prefix G
 Melbourne Cricket Ground in Melbourne, Australia, generally called "The G" by locals

Arts, entertainment  and media

Fictional characters
 G, a fictional character in the game Club Penguin
 G, a fictional character in Sega's The House of the Dead  series
 G (Street Fighter), a fictional character in the Street Fighter series
 Mr G, or Mr Gregson, a fictional character in the Australian TV comedy Summer Heights High

Films 
 G (2002 film), by Christopher Scott Cherot
 G (2004 film), a documentary about methamphetamine use among the Navajo

Music

Notation
 G (musical note)
 G major, a scale
 G major chord, Chord names and symbols (popular music)
 G minor, a scale

Albums
 G (Gerald Levert album)
 G (King Creosote album)
 G. (album), an album by Gotthard

Other music
 A prefix used to denote the Gérard catalog, a catalogue of Luigi Boccherini's works compiled by Yves Gérard

Rating systems
G is a common type of content rating that applies to media entertainment, such as films, television shows and computer games, generally denoting "General Audience" meaning that access is not restricted. The following organizations all use the rating:
 Australian Classification Board
 Canadian motion picture rating system
 Eirin
 Irish Film Classification Office
 Media Development Authority
 Motion Picture Association of America film rating system
 Movie and Television Review and Classification Board
 National Bureau of Classification (NBC)
 Office of Film and Literature Classification (New Zealand)

The "G" rating is further documented at Motion picture content rating system and Television content rating system.

Other arts, entertainment  and media
 G. (novel), by John Berger
 G (magazine)
G, the production code for the 1964 Doctor Who serial The Sensorites
 "G" Is for Gumshoe, the seventh novel in Sue Grafton's Alphabet Mystery series, published in 1990
 The G logo for the Brazilian television network Gazeta in São Paulo since 2000

Brands and enterprises
 Mercedes-Benz G-Class, an automobile
 The Gillette Company, ticker symbol G on the New York Stock Exchange

Mathematics and science

In astrophysics 
 G, a stellar classification for yellowish stars
 G, part of a provisional designation in astronomy for any comet, asteroid, or minor planet discovered between April 1 and 15

In chemistry and biology 
 g, an abbreviation for gaseous
 ATC code G, Genito-urinary system and sex hormones, a section of the Anatomical Therapeutic Chemical Classification System
 G protein, a family of proteins involved in transmitting signals across cell membranes
 G factor (psychometrics), a variable used in investigations of cognitive abilities and human intelligence
 G-spot, or Gräfenberg spot, an erogenous area of the vagina
 Gamma-Hydroxybutyric acid, a drug more commonly known as GHB
 G (or Gly), abbreviation for amino acid glycine
 Guanosine, a nucleoside
 Haplogroup G (mtDNA), a human mitochondrial haplogroup
 Haplogroup G (Y-DNA), a Y-chromosome haplogroup

In computing 
 "G", a visual programming language for National Instruments' LabVIEW
 G, the customary prefix for Gibi, the binary multiple meaning 10243 = 1073741824
 G-code, common name for computer numerical control (CNC) programming language

In linguistics 
 , a symbol in IPA for voiced uvular plosive
 , a symbol in IPA for voiced velar stop

In mathematics 
 Catalan's constant, which appears in combinatorics
 Graham's number, an extremely large number arising in Ramsey theory
 Meijer G-function 
 Metric tensor, a type of function defined on a manifold, and a generalization of the dot product

In physics

With respect to electromagnetism
 G band (disambiguation)
 Gauss (unit), a unit of magnetic induction
 Electrical conductance, g, the ease with which an electric current passes through a material
 g-factor (physics), the magnetic moment of a particle

With respect to gravitation
 Einstein tensor, G, in general relativity
 Gravitational constant, G, an empirical physical constant
 Graviton (G), a fundamental particle theorized to mediate the gravitational interaction
 Gravity of Earth, g, the local acceleration due to gravity 
 g-force, the acceleration of a body relative to free fall
 Standard gravity (g0 or gn), the standardised acceleration due to gravity on Earth

Other uses in physics
 Gibbs free energy, a function of thermodynamics
 Gluon (g), a fundamental particle which mediates the strong interaction
 Shear modulus, in materials science, the ratio of shear stress to shear strain in a material

In scales, weights and measures
 G, giga-, an SI prefix meaning 109 = 1,000,000,000
 g, gram, a unit of mass in the SI system
 General intelligence factor, or "g factor", in psychometrics
 G, Birmingham gauge, used to measure the diameter of hypodermic needles

Slang
 G, 1000 in popular culture, especially in relation to money; short for "grand"
 Gangsta, in hip hop culture, the word for a person or a style

Transportation
 G (Los Angeles Railway)
 G (New York City Subway service), the G Brooklyn–Queens Crosstown Local, a rapid transit service
 G, the aircraft registration prefix for the United Kingdom
 G Line (Los Angeles Metro)

Other uses 
 G the ground floor, particularly in elevators
 G, an ITU prefix for radio and television call signs in the United Kingdom
 'g', the growth rate, in the dividend discount model approach to financial valuation
 Dominical letter G for a common year starting on Monday
 Golf, the military time zone code for UTC+07:00
 G (or the more specific G-4 or G-6), a relatively poor grade of coin
 G (short for "Greek") in biblical criticism refers to the Septuagint, the oldest extant translation of the Hebrew scriptures into Greek.
 Guard (gridiron football)

See also
 1G (disambiguation)
 G1 (disambiguation)
 Gee (disambiguation)
 GS (disambiguation)

ca:G#Significats de G
la:G#Abbreviationes
hu:G#Jelentései
ja:G#G の意味
simple:G#Meanings for G
sl:G#Pomeni
fi:G#G-kirjaimen merkityksiä
sv:G#Betydelser